Morten Høi Jensen is a Danish biographer, and literary critic.

He graduated from The New School.

His work appeared in Commonweal, gawker, Los Angeles Review of Books, salon, The American Interest, The New York Review of Books, and The New Republic.

Works 

 The Difficult Death: The Life and Work of Jens Peter Jacobsen,  Yale University Press, New Haven, 2017.

References

External links 

 https://www.mortenhoijensen.com/

Living people
Danish biographers
Year of birth missing (living people)
The New School alumni
Danish literary critics